is a rock-fill dam built on the Surikami River (part of the Abukuma River system) in the Moniwa area of Iizaka, Fukushima, Fukushima Prefecture, Japan. It was opened in 2006 and is administered by the Tohoku Regional Bureau Ministry of Land, Infrastructure and Transport.

A multipurpose dam, it was built to provide water to the nearby cities of Nihonmatsu, Fukushima and surrounding areas. It also works in conjunction with Shichikashuku Dam and Miharu Dam to control flooding on the Abukuma River. There are also hydroelectric power facilities operated by Tohoku Electric Power.

The name of the artificial lake the dam forms was chosen from over a thousand ballots cast by the public, with  ultimately being chosen.

History
In 1966 Fukushima City released the results of a study on predicted future water demand, recommending the building of a dam on the upper portion of the Surikami River. A preliminary survey was carried out in 1973, and a site was chosen. In the following years various geological surveys and public meetings were held.

Residents whose land was located in the area planned to be flooded were moved beginning in April 1991. In October of the following year, construction to divert the Surikami River began, and in December 1994 construction on the dam itself commenced. Filling of the embankment was completed in July 2002.

A test fill of the reservoir began on February 19, 2004 and was completed in June of the following year. The dam was fully completed on September 25, 2005.

References 

Dams in Fukushima Prefecture
Dams completed in 2006